Vaupel is a surname originating from Germany. Notable people with the surname include:

Egon Vaupel (born 1950), German politician (SPD)
Friedrich Karl Johann Vaupel (1876–1927), German botanist
Hans Georg Vaupel (born 1934), German sculptor
James Vaupel (born 1945), American demographer